Manuel Musto (September 16, 1893) was an Argentinian impressionist painter. He was born in Rosario.

In 1914 Musto traveled to Florence, Italy. He returned to Argentina after hearing of his father's death. His style was influenced by the Italian school of the 19th century, including bucolic scenes of the countryside and flowers. The bulk of his work is part of the permanent collection of the Museum of Fine Arts in Rosario. The house where he resided is home to the art school that honors his legacy and name.

Musto died at age 47 on September 12, 1940.

Bibliography 
 
El Camino de Manuel Musto Hipocampo, Rosario, 1942, by Ricardo Ernesto Montes i Bradley.

1893 births
1940 deaths
20th-century Argentine painters
Argentine male painters
20th-century Argentine male artists